Rolling Hills is an unincorporated community and census-designated place (CDP) in Madera County, California, United States, north of Fresno on State Route 41 (Yosemite Freeway). The population was 793 at the 2020 census.

Geography

Demographics
The 2010 United States Census reported that Rolling Hills had a population of 742. The racial makeup of Rolling Hills was 642 (86.5%) White, 16 (2.2%) African American, 11 (1.5%) Native American, 25 (3.4%) Asian, 2 (0.3%) Pacific Islander, 34 (4.6%) from other races, and 12 (1.6%) from two or more races. Hispanic or Latino of any race were 143 persons (19.3%).

The Census reported that 737 people (99.3% of the population) lived in households, 0 (0%) lived in non-institutionalized group quarters, and 5 (0.7%) were institutionalized.

There were 292 households, out of which 63 (21.6%) had children under the age of 18 living in them, 207 (70.9%) were opposite-sex married couples living together, 15 (5.1%) had a female householder with no husband present, 11 (3.8%) had a male householder with no wife present.  There were 13 (4.5%) unmarried opposite-sex partnerships, and 2 (0.7%) same-sex married couples or partnerships. 48 households (16.4%) were made up of individuals, and 32 (11.0%) had someone living alone who was 65 years of age or older. The average household size was 2.52.  There were 233 families (79.8% of all households); the average family size was 2.81.

The population was spread out, with 122 people (16.4%) under the age of 18, 45 people (6.1%) aged 18 to 24, 113 people (15.2%) aged 25 to 44, 282 people (38.0%) aged 45 to 64, and 180 people (24.3%) who were 65 years of age or older.  The median age was 53.0 years. For every 100 females, there were 100.5 males.  For every 100 females age 18 and over, there were 102.0 males.

The homeowner vacancy rate was 0%; the rental vacancy rate was 5.6%.  697 people (93.9% of the population) lived in owner-occupied housing units and 40 people (5.4%) lived in rental housing units.

References

Census-designated places in Madera County, California
Census-designated places in California